Marc Carrière (born 21 September 1964) is a politician in the Canadian province of Quebec, who was elected to represent the riding of Chapleau in the National Assembly of Quebec in the 2008 provincial election. He is a member of the Quebec Liberal Party.

Born in Gatineau, Quebec, Carrière obtained a bachelor's degree from the University of Ottawa. He was a member of the municipality of Val-des-Monts council from 1992 to 1996 and was mayor of the same municipality from 1996 until his election in 2008 in which he won without opposition in 2000 and 2005. He was a prefect for the Les Collines-de-l'Outaouais Regional County. He was also the president of the Conférence régionale des élus de l’Outaouais (CREO) from 2004 to 2008.

Carrière became the first elected prefect of Les Collines-de-l'Outaouais in the 2021 Quebec municipal elections.

Electoral record

References

External links
 
 Liberal Party biography 

1964 births
French Quebecers
Living people
Mayors of places in Quebec
Politicians from Gatineau
Quebec Liberal Party MNAs
University of Ottawa alumni
21st-century Canadian politicians